The American Artists Professional League (AAPL) is an American organization that promotes artists and their works. It was formed in 1928 in New York City by Frederick Ballard Williams, and the first meeting was held at the Salmagundi Art Club on January 29, 1928. Ballard became the organization's national chairman. The organization has hosted an annual Grand National Exhibition for 93 years to promote artists specializing in realistic art forms.

References

External links
 Official site

American artist groups and collectives
Arts organizations established in 1928
1928 establishments in the United States
1928 establishments in New York City